Alfred Noble (August 7, 1844 - April 19, 1914) was an American civil engineer who was best known for his work on canals, particularly the Soo Locks between the Great Lakes of Huron and Superior, and the Panama Canal. Noble graduated with his University of Michigan class in June 1870, receiving his degree in civil engineering at age 26. After graduation, Noble went to work full-time on harbor surveys and improvements along the shores of Lake Michigan and Lake Huron.

He was chief engineer for the Pennsylvania Railroad's New York City East River projects, which built tunnels carrying four lanes of track between Manhattan and Queens. Amtrak, the Long Island Railroad, and New Jersey Transit continue to run trains through these tunnels well into their second century of use.

He was president of the American Society of Civil Engineers in 1903, and in 1929, the society established the Alfred Noble Prize in his honor (not to be confused with the Nobel Prize).

References 

American civil engineers
Panama Canal
University of Michigan College of Engineering alumni
1844 births
1914 deaths